The V9X is a common rail 65 degree V6 24-valve DOHC turbo-diesel developed by the Renault-Nissan Alliance, and first installed in the Renault Laguna in 2009. It was subsequently made available for both longitudinal-engine vehicles including Nissan Pathfinder, Nissan Navara, Infiniti FX, Infiniti EX, and Infiniti M and transverse-engine vehicles including Renault Latitude and Laguna Coupé.

Engine power and combustion
Peak torque is achieved from as low as 1,750 rpm to 2,500 rpm, with  available from 1,500 rpm. Idle speed is 650 rpm.

The engine has a single turbocharger located within the vee of the engine, fed from both banks and is equipped with an intercooler and Bosch Common rail fuel injection. The combustion chamber design was optimized to improve the balance between emission levels and fuel efficiency; the compression ratio is 16.0:1.

Emissions and fuel consumption

It is fitted to the following vehicles:
 2012–2013 Infiniti QX70D
 2010–2017 Infiniti FX30d
 2010–2013 Infiniti EX30d
 2010–2014 Nissan Pathfinder (R51)
 2010–2015 Nissan Navara (D40)
 2010–2014 Infiniti M30d
 2010–2015 Renault Laguna III
 2010–2015 Renault Latitude

See also
 List of Nissan engines
 Nissan

References

V9X
V9X
V6 engines
Diesel engines by model